Evlagh Beg (Irish derived place name, Aibhleach Beag meaning 'The Small Place of Fires' (possibly from lime-burning).) is a townland in the civil parish of Kildallan, barony of Tullyhunco, County Cavan, Ireland.

Geography

Evlagh Beg is bounded on the west by Greaghacholea townland, on the east by Evlagh More townland, on the south by Drumlarah and Killygorman townlands and on the north by Cornacrum and Mullaghmore, Tullyhunco townlands. Its chief geographical features are small streams, a quarry, a spring well and forestry plantations. Evlagh Beg is traversed by minor public roads and rural lanes. The townland covers 166 acres.

History

The 1609 Plantation of Ulster Baronial map depicts the townland as Eyulagh. A Plantation of Ulster grant dated 1611 spells the name as Evelagh. The 1641 Depositions spell the name as Leuella.

From medieval times up to the early 1600s, the land belonged to the McKiernan Clan.

In the Plantation of Ulster by grant dated 16 August 1611, King James VI and I granted, inter alia, Evelagh to Thomas Jones-Evelagh to Thomas Johnes, gentleman. At Cavan, on 26 July 1642, the aforesaid Thomas Jones and his son William Jones gave the names of rebel leaders in the Cavan Irish Rebellion of 1641, including, inter alia, Laighlen mac Torlough McKernan of Leuella, James mac Laighlen McKernan of same and Hugh mac Laighlen McKernan of same. They also stated- . In a further deposition dated 26 July 1642, the said Thomas Jones of Drumminnion, Kildallan parish stated- .

In the Hearth Money Rolls compiled on 29 September 1663 there was one Hearth Tax payer in Eulaghbegg- Brian McKernan.

In the Cavan Poll Book of 1761, there were two people registered to vote in Evelagh Beg in the 1761 Irish general election - Alexander Faires and David Fairis. Each was entitled to cast two votes. The four election candidates were Charles Coote, 1st Earl of Bellomont and  Lord Newtownbutler (later Brinsley Butler, 2nd Earl of Lanesborough), both of whom were then elected Member of Parliament for Cavan County. The losing candidates were George Montgomery (MP) of Ballyconnell and Barry Maxwell, 1st Earl of Farnham. Absence from the poll book either meant a resident did not vote or more likely was not a freeholder entitled to vote, which would mean most of the inhabitants of Evlagh Beg.

The townland formed part of the Farnham estate in the 19th century. The estate papers are now in the National Library of Ireland and those papers mentioning Evlagh Beg are at reference 21. F. 118/40 and 21. F. 118/41.

The 1790 Cavan Carvaghs list spells the name as Eulagh-beg.

Ambrose Leet's 1814 Directory spells the name as Evlagh.

In the 1825 Registry of Freeholders for County Cavan there was one freeholder registered in Evelagh-beg: Thomas Crawford. He was a Forty-shilling freeholders holding a lease for lives from his landlord, Lord Farnham. 

The Tithe Applotment Books 1823-1837 list four tithepayers in the townland.

The 1836 Ordnance Survey Namebooks state- The soil is good intermixed with limestone which is burned and sold in Killyshandra at 10d per barrell.

The Evlagh Beg Valuation Office books are available for May 1838.

Griffith's Valuation of 1857 lists twelve landholders in the townland.

Census

In the 1901 census of Ireland, there were six families listed in the townland.

In the 1911 census of Ireland, there were four families listed in the townland.

Antiquities

 A lime kiln

References

External links
 The IreAtlas Townland Data Base

Townlands of County Cavan